The Freedom Party of Austria (FPÖ) is a national-conservative and right-wing populist political party in Austria. It was led by Norbert Hofer from September 2019 to 1 June 2021. It is the third largest of five parties in the National Council, with 30 of the 183 seats, and won 16.2% of votes cast in the 2019 legislative election. It is represented in all nine state legislatures, and a member of two state cabinets (both operating under the Proporz system). On a European level, the FPÖ is a founding member of the Identity and Democracy Party and its three Members of the European Parliament (MEPs) sit with the Identity and Democracy (ID) group.

The FPÖ was founded in 1956 as the successor to the short-lived Federation of Independents (VdU), representing pan-Germanists and national liberals opposed to socialism, represented by the Social Democratic Party of Austria (SPÖ), and Catholic clericalism represented by the Austrian People's Party (ÖVP). Its first leader, Anton Reinthaller, was a former Nazi functionary and SS officer, though the party did not advocate extreme right policies and presented itself as residing in the political centre. During this time, the FPÖ was the third largest party in Austria and had modest support. Under the leadership of Norbert Steger in the early 1980s, it sought to style itself on the German Free Democratic Party. It supported the first government of SPÖ Chancellor Bruno Kreisky after the 1970 election, as well as that of Fred Sinowatz from 1983 to 1986.

Jörg Haider became leader of the party in 1986, after which it began an ideological turn towards right-wing populism. This resulted in a strong surge in electoral support, but also led the SPÖ to break ties, and a splinter in the form of the Liberal Forum in 1993. In the 1999 election, the FPÖ won 26.9% of the vote, becoming the second most popular party, ahead of the ÖVP by around 500 votes. The two parties eventually reached a coalition agreement in which ÖVP retained the office of Chancellor. The FPÖ soon lost most of its popularity, falling to 10% in the 2002 election, but the government was renewed. Internal tensions led Haider and much of the party leadership to leave in 2005, forming the Alliance for the Future of Austria (BZÖ), which replaced the FPÖ as governing partner.

Heinz-Christian Strache then became leader, and the party gradually regained its popularity, peaking at 26.0% in the 2017 election. The FPÖ once again became junior partner in government with the ÖVP. In May 2019, the Ibiza affair led to the collapse of the government and the resignation of Strache from both the offices of Vice-Chancellor and party leader. The resulting snap election saw the FPÖ fall to 16.2% and return to opposition.

History

Political background

The FPÖ is a descendant of the pan-German and national liberal camp (Lager) dating back to the Revolutions of 1848 in the Habsburg areas. During the interwar era, the national liberal camp (gathered in the Greater German People's Party) fought against the mutually-hostile Christian Social and Marxist camps in their struggles to structure the new republic according to their respective ideologies. After a short civil war, the Federal State of Austria, an authoritarian Christian Social dictatorship, was established in 1934. By 1938, with the Anschluss of Austria into Nazi Germany, the national liberal camp (which had always striven for an inclusion of Austria into a Greater Germany) had been swallowed whole by Austrian National Socialism and all other parties were eventually absorbed into Nazi totalitarianism. Both Socialists and Christian Socials were persecuted under the Nazi regime, and the national liberal camp was scarred after the war due to guilt by association with National Socialism.

In 1949, the Federation of Independents (VdU) was founded as a national liberal alternative to the main Austrian parties—the Social Democratic Party (SPÖ) and the Austrian People's Party (ÖVP), successors to the interwar era Marxist and Christian Social parties. The VdU was founded by two liberal Salzburg journalists—former Nazi Germany prisoners—who wanted to stay clear of the mainstream socialist and Catholic camps and feared that hostility following the hastily devised postwar denazification policy (which did not distinguish between party members and actual war criminals) might stimulate a revival of Nazism. Aiming to become a political home to everyone not a member of the two main parties, the VdU incorporated an array of political movements—including free-market liberals, populists, former Nazis and German nationalists, all of whom had been unable to join either of the two main parties. The VdU won 12% of the vote in the 1949 general election, but saw its support beginning to decline soon afterward. It evolved into the FPÖ by 1955/56 after merging with the minor Freedom Party in 1955; a new party was formed on 17 October 1955, and its founding congress was held on 7 April 1956.

Early years (1956–1980)
The first FPÖ party leader was Anton Reinthaller, a former Nazi Minister of Agriculture and SS officer. He had been asked by ÖVP Chancellor Julius Raab to take over the movement rather than let it be led by a more socialist-leaning group. While the majority of former Nazis had probably joined the two main parties in absolute numbers, they formed a greater percentage of FPÖ members due to the party's small size. Nevertheless, none of them were real revolutionaries and they pursued pragmatic, non-ideological policies, and the FPÖ presented itself as a moderate party. The FPÖ served as a vehicle for them to integrate in the Second Republic; the party was a welcome partner with both the SPÖ and ÖVP in regional and local politics, although it was excluded at the national level. The ÖVP and the FPÖ ran a joint candidate for the 1957 presidential election, who lost.

Reinthaller was replaced as leader in 1958 by Friedrich Peter (also a former SS officer), who led the party through the 1960s and 1970s and moved it towards the political centre. In 1966 the ÖVP-SPÖ Grand Coalition which had governed Austria since the war was broken, was put to an end, when the ÖVP gained enough votes to govern alone. SPÖ leader Bruno Kreisky (himself a Jew) defended Peter's past and initiated a political relationship—and a personal friendship—with Peter; in 1970 the FPÖ was, for the first time, able to tolerate an SPÖ minority government. In 1967 the more extreme faction in the FPÖ broke away and established the National Democratic Party, seen by some observers as a final shedding of the party's Nazi legacy. Under the influence of Kreisky, a new generation of liberals brought the FPÖ into the Liberal International in 1978. During the years under Peter the party never won more than 8% of the national vote in general elections, and generally did not have much political significance. It did, however, demand electoral reforms that benefitted smaller parties as the price for tolerating Kreisky's minority government.

Steger leadership (1980–1986)
Liberal Norbert Steger was chosen as new FPÖ party leader in 1980; in an effort to gain popularity, he helped the FPÖ become established as a moderate centrist liberal party. His vision was to transform the FPÖ into an Austrian version of the German Free Democratic Party, focusing on free-market and anti-statist policies. In the 1980s, the Austrian political system began to change; the dominance of the SPÖ and ÖVP started to erode, and the Austrian electorate began to swing to the right. SPÖ leader Bruno Kreisky had encouraged the FPÖ's move to the centre, in order to establish an SPÖ-FPÖ alliance against the ÖVP. The 1983 general election was a watershed; the SPÖ lost its absolute majority in Parliament, which resulted in the formation of an SPÖ-FPÖ "Small Coalition". Ironically, the 1983 election result was the worst for the FPÖ in its history (it received slightly less than 5% of the vote), and during the next few years the party saw 2–3% support—or even less—in opinion polls. As a consequence, the party was soon torn by internal strife.

In 1983, the right-wing Jörg Haider took over the leadership of the FPÖ's significant Carinthia branch. Its importance dated to the Kärntner Abwehrkampf (Carinthian defensive struggle) following World War I, and subsequent anti-Slavic sentiment arising from a fear of being taken over by Yugoslavia. Encouraged by the mass media, a struggle soon developed between Steger and Haider over the future of the party. In the 1985 Reder case, for instance, Haider staunchly supported FPÖ Minister of Defence Friedhelm Frischenschlager when the latter welcomed convicted Waffen-SS war criminal Walter Reder in person when Reder arrived at Graz Airport after his release from Italy. While the FPÖ struggled with its low support at the national level in the mid-1980s, this was in sharp contrast to the party's position in Haider's Carinthia (where the party had increased its support from 11.7% in the 1979 provincial election to 16% in 1984).

During the 1986 National Convention in Innsbruck, the internal struggle developed into an open conflict; this led Haider to victory as new FPÖ party leader with 58% of the vote, supported by conservative and pan-German factions. However, incoming SPÖ Chancellor Franz Vranitzky—who also entered office in 1986—had strong negative feelings towards Haider, who he felt was too far-right. Vranitzky subsequently announced an election in 1986, in the process disbanding the SPÖ-FPÖ "Small Coalition" and, after the election, entered into a coalition with the ÖVP. Under Haider's leadership, the FPÖ increased its vote to 9.7%, while the party gradually became more right-wing and its former liberal influence waned. As the FPÖ increased its electoral support with Haider's radical-populist rhetoric, the party reduced its chances of forming coalitions with other parties.

Haider leadership (1986–2000)

With Jörg Haider as the new party leader, the 1989 Carinthia provincial election caused a sensation; the SPÖ lost its majority and the ÖVP was relegated to third-party status, as the FPÖ finished second with 29% of the vote. The FPÖ formed a coalition with the ÖVP, with Haider as Governor of Carinthia (at this point his greatest political triumph). By the 1990 general election the party had moved away from the liberal mainstream course, instead focusing on immigration and becoming increasingly critical of the political establishment and the EU. Following a remark made by Haider in 1991 about the "decent employment policy" of Nazi Germany (in contrast to that of the current Austrian government), he was removed as governor by a joint SPÖ-ÖVP initiative and replaced by the ÖVP's Christof Zernatto. Later that year, however, the FPÖ saw gains made in three provincial elections (most notably in Vienna).

While Haider often employed controversial rhetoric, his expressed political goals included small government with more direct democracy rather than centralized totalitarianism. Following the increasing importance of immigration as a political issue, in 1993 the party decided to launch the "Austria First!" initiative (calling for a referendum on immigration issues). The initiative was controversial and five FPÖ MPs, including Heide Schmidt, left the party and founded the Liberal Forum (LiF). The FPÖ's relations with the Liberal International also became increasingly strained, and later that year the FPÖ left the LI (which was preparing to expel it). In turn, the LiF soon joined the Liberal International instead. In 1999, Haider was again elected Governor of Carinthia.

Coalition government (2000–2005)
In the 1999 general election the FPÖ won 27% of the votes, more than in any previous election—beating the ÖVP for the first time by a small margin. In February 2000, the ÖVP agreed to form a coalition government with the FPÖ. Normally, Haider should have become federal chancellor.  However, it soon became apparent that Haider was too controversial to be part of the government, let alone lead it. Amid intense international criticism of the FPÖ's participation in the government, the FPÖ ceded the chancellorship to Wolfgang Schüssel of the ÖVP. As a concession to the FPÖ, the party was given the power to appoint the Ministers of Finance and Social Affairs. Later that month Haider stepped down as party chairman, replaced by Susanne Riess-Passer. Having threatened a diplomatic boycott of Austria, the other fourteen European Union (EU) countries introduced sanctions after the government had been formed; other than formal EU meetings, contacts with Austria were reduced. The measures were justified by the EU, which stated that "the admission of the FPÖ into a coalition government legitimises the extreme right in Europe."

The party had been kept on the sidelines for most of the Second Republic, except for its brief role in government in the 1980s.  Along with the party's origins and its focus on issues such as immigration and questions of identity and belonging, the party had been subjected to a strategy of cordon sanitaire by the SPÖ and ÖVP. The EU sanctions were lifted in September after a report had found that the measures were effective only in the short term; in the long run, they might give rise to an anti-EU backlash. Some observers noted an inconsistency in that there had been no sanctions against Italy when the post-fascist Italian Social Movement/National Alliance had entered government in 1994.

The FPÖ struggled with its shift from an anti-establishment party to being part of the government, which led to decreasing internal stability and electoral support. Its blue collar voters became unhappy with the party's need to support some neo-liberal ÖVP economic reforms; the government's peak in unpopularity occurred when tax reform was postponed at the same time that the government was planning to purchase new interceptor jets. Internecine strife erupted in the party over strategy between party members in government and Haider, who allied himself with the party's grassroots. Several prominent FPÖ government ministers resigned in the 2002 "Knittelfeld Putsch" after strong attacks by Haider, which led to new elections being called.

In the subsequent election campaign, the party was deeply divided and unable to organise an effective political strategy. It changed leaders five times in less than two months, and in the 2002 general election decreased its share of the vote to 10.2%, almost two-thirds less than its previous share. Most of its voters sided with the ÖVP, which became the largest party in Austria with 43% of the vote. Nevertheless, the coalition government of the ÖVP and FPÖ was revived after the election; however, there was increasing criticism within the FPÖ against the party's mission of winning elections at any cost.

Haider's departure for BZÖ
After an internal row had threatened to tear the FPÖ apart, former chairman Jörg Haider, then-chairwoman and his sister Ursula Haubner, vice chancellor Hubert Gorbach and all of the FPÖ ministers left the party and on 4 April 2005 founded a new political party called the Alliance for the Future of Austria (BZÖ). Austria's chancellor Wolfgang Schüssel followed, changing his coalition with the FPÖ into cooperation with the BZÖ. In Haider's stronghold of Carinthia, the local FPÖ branch became the Carinthia branch of the BZÖ.

Strache's early leadership (2005–2017)
The FPÖ fared much better than the BZÖ in polls following the 2005 split, with the first tests in regional elections in Styria and Burgenland. On 23 April 2005 Heinz-Christian Strache was elected as new chairman of the FPÖ, taking over from interim leader Hilmar Kabas. As most of the party's office-seeking elite had gone over to the BZÖ, the FPÖ was again free from responsibility. Under Strache the party's ideology grew more radical, and it returned to its primary goal of vote-maximising. The FPÖ did reasonably well in October's Vienna election, in which Strache was the leading candidate and ran a campaign directed strongly against immigration. It took a 14.9% share, while the BZÖ won just 1.2%.

By the 2006 general election, the FPÖ returned to promoting anti-immigration, anti-Islam and Eurosceptic issues. It won 11% of the vote and 21 seats in parliament, while the BZÖ only barely passed the 4% threshold needed to enter Parliament. The subsequent coalition between the SPÖ and the ÖVP left both parties in opposition. In the 2008 general election both the FPÖ and the BZÖ rose significantly at the expense of the SPÖ and the ÖVP. Both parties increased their percentage of the vote by about 6.5%, with the FPÖ at 17.4% and the BZÖ at 10.7%— together gaining 28.2%, and thus both breaking the record vote for the FPÖ in the 1999 election. In the 2009 European Parliament election the FPÖ doubled its 2004 results, winning 12.8% of the vote and 2 seats.

In December 2009 the local Carinthia branch of the BZÖ, its stronghold, broke away and founded the Freedom Party in Carinthia (FPK); it cooperated with the FPÖ at the federal level, modeling itself on the German CDU/CSU relationship. The leader of the branch, Uwe Scheuch, had fallen out with BZÖ leader Josef Bucher after the latter had introduced a "moderate, right-wing liberal" and more economically oriented ideology. In the 2010 Vienna elections, the FPÖ increased its vote to 25.8% (slightly less than the record result of 1996); this was seen as a victory for Strache, due to his popularity among young people. This was only the second time in the postwar era that the SPÖ lost its absolute majority in the city.

After its convention in early 2011 midway between general elections, the FPÖ had a support in opinion polls of around 24–29%—at par with the SPÖ and ÖVP, and above the BZÖ. Among people under 30 years of age, the FPÖ had the support of 42%.

In the 2013 legislative election the party obtained 20.51% of votes, while BZÖ scored 3.53% and lost all of its seats. After the election SPÖ and ÖVP renewed their coalition and FPÖ remained in opposition.

In June 2015 the main part of the federal party section of Salzburg split off and formed the Free Party Salzburg.

In the 2016 Austrian presidential election, Freedom Party candidate Norbert Hofer won the first round of the election, receiving 35.1% of the vote, making that election the Freedom Party's best ever election result in its history. However, in the second round, Hofer was defeated by Alexander Van der Bellen, who received the support of 50.3% compared to Hofer's 49.7%. In July first the Constitutional Court of Austria voided the results of the second round due to mishandling of postal votes; although the court did not find evidence of deliberate manipulation. The re-vote took place on 4 December 2016 when Van der Bellen won by a significantly larger margin.

Coalition government (2017–2019)
In the 2017 Austrian legislative election, the FPÖ obtained 26% of votes, increased its seats by eleven seats to 51 seats, achieving its best result since the 1999 election. It was leading every other party until Sebastian Kurz became the leader of the ÖVP, and polling still predicted it would reach second place. Despite the FPÖ's decline in support during the election campaign, it still achieved an ideological victory as Austria's governing parties, particularly the ÖVP under Kurz but also the SPÖ, shifted noticeably to the right, adopting much of the FPÖ's policies.

The FPÖ entered coalition talks with the ÖVP, and in December 2017, they reached an agreement and created a coalition government. The FPÖ gained control over six ministries, including defense, the interior, and foreign affairs.

Ibiza affair (May 2019) 

In mid-May 2019, secretly made footage was released, apparently showing Strache soliciting funds for the party from a purported Russian national. In the video, Strache also suggests his intention to censor the Austrian media in a way that would favor the FPÖ, citing the media landscape of Orban's Hungary.

The footage led to the collapse of the coalition with the ÖVP on 20 May 2019.

Post-Ibiza era (2019–Present) 
In the 2019 general election the party's support collapsed to 16%, down from 26% in 2017. In the aftermath of the election they collapsed to a record low of 10% in April 2020, but as of November  2022 they have stabilized to around 23–25%.

Norbert Hofer replaced Strache as party leader in September 2019, just before the election.  He resigned on 1 June 2021. On 7 June 2021, Herbert Kickl was elected the new leader of the party by the central party committee, a process that was made official at a party convention vote on 19 June 2021.

Ideology

Historically, the FPÖ had an ideological basis in national liberalism, Pan-Germanism, and anti-clericalism, while retaining a significant classical-liberal minority faction.

Under the leadership of Heinz-Christian Strache, the FPÖ has focused on describing itself as a Heimat and social party. This means that the party portrays itself as a guarantor of Austrian identity and social welfare. Economically, it supports regulated liberalism with privatisation and low taxes, combined with support for the welfare state; however, it maintains that it will be impossible to uphold the welfare state if current immigration policies are continued.

The present FPÖ has variously been described as right-wing populist, national conservative, "right-conservative", "right-national", and far right.  The party has traditionally been part of the national liberal camp, and generally identifies with a freiheitlich (libertarian) profile. Leading current party members such as Andreas Mölzer and Harald Vilimsky have considered themselves as national liberal "cultural Germans", while Barbara Rosenkranz has considered her ideology as national conservative.

Individual freedom

The principle of individual freedom in society was already one of the central points in the FPÖ (and VdU's) programme during the 1950s. The party did not regard its liberalism and its pan-German, nationalist positions as contradictory. From the late 1980s through the 1990s, the party developed economically, supporting tax reduction, less state intervention and more privatisation. Starting in the late 2000s, the party has taken a more populist tack, combining this position with qualified support for the welfare state. According to a 2020 study, the party's policy on welfare "is restricted to the mitigation of welfare retrenchment for the core workforce, whereas the party has been a protagonist of tax cuts, trade union disempowerment and, more recently, welfare chauvinism." It criticised unemployment and alleged welfare-state abuse by immigrants which, it said, threatened the welfare state and pensioners' benefits.

Anti-establishment
During the 1980s and 1990s, Austrian voters became increasingly disaffected with the rule by the two major parties (SPÖ and ÖVP). This coincided with the leadership of Haider, who presented the FPÖ as the only party which could seriously challenge the two parties' dominance. The party strongly criticised the power concentrated in the hands of the elite, until the FPÖ joined the government in 2000. In the 1990s the party advocated replacing the present Second Austrian Republic with a Third Republic, since it sought a radical transformation from "a party state to a citizens' democracy". The party wanted to provide more referendums, directly elect the federal chancellor, significantly reduce the number of ministries, and devolve power to the federal states and local councils. Surveys have shown that anti-establishment positions were one of the top reasons for voters to vote for the FPÖ. Its anti-establishment position proved incompatible with being in government during the first half of the 2000s, but was renewed after most of the parliamentary group left to join the BZÖ in 2005.

Immigration and Islam
Immigration was not a significant issue in Austria until the 1980s. Under Haider's leadership, immigration went from being practically non-existent on the list of most important issues for voters before 1989, to the 10th-most-important in 1990, and the second-most-important in 1992. In 1993, the controversial "Austria First!" initiative attempted to collect signatures for a referendum on immigration restrictions and asserted that "Austria is not a country of immigration."

The party maintained that "the protection of cultural identity and social peace in Austria requires a stop to immigration", maintaining that its concern was not against foreigners, but to safeguard the interests and cultural identity of native Austrians. Although during the late 1990s the party attacked the influence of Islamic extremism, this was later expanded to include "Islamisation" and the increasing number of Muslims in general. According to The Economist, the hostility to Muslims is "a strategy that resonates with voters of Serbian background, whom the party has assiduously cultivated." The party has also vowed to outlaw the distribution of free copies of the Koran.

During the period of ÖVP-FPÖ government, many amendments were introduced to tighten the country's immigration policies. The number of new asylum applications, for example, was reduced from 32,000 in 2003 to 13,300 in 2006.

Heimat
From the mid-1980s, the concept of Heimat (a word meaning both "the homeland" and a more general notion of cultural identity) has been central to the ideology of the FPÖ, although its application has slightly changed with time. Initially, Heimat indicated the feeling of national belonging influenced by a pan-German vision; the party assured voters in 1985 that "the overwhelming majority of Austrians belong to the German ethnic and cultural community." Although it was noted then that Austria was the mother country which held the national traditions, this would later be favoured more explicitly over the pan-German concept. In 1995 Haider declared an end to pan-Germanism in the party, and in the 1997 party manifesto the former community of "German people" was replaced with the "Austrian people". Under the leadership of Strache, the concept of Heimat has been promoted and developed more deeply than it had been previously. After his reelection as chairman in 2011, the German aspects of the party's programme were formally reintroduced.

Foreign policy
At the end of the Cold War, the FPÖ became more eurosceptic, which was reflected by its change from Pan-Germanism to Austrian nationalism. The party's opposition to the European Union grew stronger in the 1990s. The FPÖ opposed Austria's joining the EU in 1994, and promoted a popular initiative against the replacement of the Austrian schilling with the euro in 1998, but to no avail. Owing to perceived differences between Turkish and European culture, the party opposes the accession of Turkey to the EU; it has declared that should this happen, Austria must immediately leave the EU. Current party leader Norbert Hofer has said that Austria should consider a referendum on EU membership should Turkey join the block or if the EU makes any further attempt to become a Federal superstate.

The party's views on the United States and the Middle East have evolved over time. Despite the anti-American views of some right-wing forums in the 1970s and 1980s (that chiefly were rooted in worries over US cultural expansion and hegemonic role in world politics at the expense of Europe), the FPÖ were more positively inclined towards the United States under Haider's leadership in the late 1980s and 1990s. However, this changed in 2003 following Haider visiting Saddam Hussein on the eve of the Iraq War; he subsequently condemned US foreign policy and derided George W. Bush as not being very different from Hussein. This move was strongly criticised by the FPÖ, which was part of the then-current government. Nevertheless, in the mid- to late 2000s the FPÖ too criticised US foreign policy as promoted by Bush, which it saw as leading to increased levels of violence in the Middle East. The party also became more critical of Israel's part in the IsraelPalestine conflict.

By 2010, under Heinz-Christian Strache's leadership, the party became more supportive of Israel. In December 2010 the FPÖ (along with the representatives of like-minded rightist parties) visited Israel, where they issued the "Jerusalem Declaration", which affirmed Israel's right to exist and defend itself, particularly against Islamic terror. The party also recognises Jerusalem as Israel's capital. At the FPÖ's invitation, Israeli Druze MK Ayoob Kara of the Likud party subsequently visited Vienna.

Strache, at about the same time, said he wanted to meet with the front figures of the American Tea Party movement (which he described as "highly interesting"). He has also declared himself "a friend of the Serbs", who constitute one of the largest immigrant groups in Austria. Siding with Serbia, the FPÖ rejects the independence of Kosovo. FPÖ also call to lift "damaging and pointless" international sanctions against Russia, approved by the EU. Following the 2022 Russian invasion of Ukraine, FPÖ MEPs voted in the European Parliament to designate Russia as a state sponsor of terrorism. However, the party continues to oppose sanctions on Russian energy, calling for a national referendum on the issue.

Presently the FPÖ advocates the introduction of a hard north Euro and a soft south Euro.

International relations
While the FPÖ is currently not a member of any European or international organisations, the party has ties with several European political parties and groupings. Additionally, according to political analyst Thomas Hofer, the party's policies and brash style helped inspire like-minded parties across Europe. From 1978 to 1993, under the party's liberal leadership, the party was a member of the Liberal International. In the early years of Haider's leadership, meetings were held with figures such as Jean-Marie Le Pen of the French National Front and Franz Schönhuber of the German Republicans. In the late 1990s, however, he chose to distance himself from Le Pen, and refused to join Le Pen's EuroNat project. Following the FPÖ's entrance in government in 2000, Haider sought to establish his own alliance of right-wing parties. For his project, Haider tried to establish stable cooperations with the Vlaams Blok party in Belgium and the Northern League party in Italy, as well as some other parties and party groupings. In the end, the efforts to establish a new alliance of parties were not successful.

Under the leadership of Strache, the party has cooperated mainly with the Northern League, Vlaams Belang (successor to the Vlaams Blok, which it has traditionally maintained good ties with), and the Pro Germany Citizens' Movement in Germany. The FPÖ also has contacts with the Danish People's Party, the Slovak National Party, the Sweden Democrats, the Hungarian Fidesz, the Lithuanian Order and Justice, IMRO – Bulgarian National Movement, the Dutch Party for Freedom, Alternative for Germany and the German Freedom party. In 2007, the party's then-only MEP was a member of the short-lived Identity, Tradition and Sovereignty grouping in the European Parliament. Outside the EU, it has contacts with Tomislav Nikolić of the Serbian Progressive Party (formerly of the Serbian Radical Party), the Swiss People's Party, the Israeli Likud, and the United Russia party. Likud has stated that it has not had contact with the FPÖ since the resignation of Strache as party leader.

At a conference in 2011, Strache and the new leader of the French National Front, Marine Le Pen, announced deeper cooperation between their parties. Shortly thereafter, the FPÖ attempted to become a member of the Europe for Freedom and Democracy group, but was vetoed by some of its parties. The FPÖ's two MEPs are individual members of the establishing European Alliance for Freedom. After the 2014 European elections, the party joined the National Front, the Northern League, Vlaams Belang and the Czech Civic Conservative Party in forming the Movement for a Europe of Nations and Freedom, and participated along with these parties, the Dutch Party for Freedom, the Alternative for Germany, the Polish Congress of the New Right and a former member of the UK Independence Party in the Europe of Nations and Freedom parliamentary group.

Election results

National Council

President

European Parliament

State Parliaments

Party leaders
The following is a list of the party leaders of the FPÖ:

Notes

References

Works cited

Further reading

External links 

 
 Country Studies - Austria

 
Nationalist parties in Austria
Anti-Islam political parties in Europe
Right-wing populism in Austria
Eurosceptic parties in Austria
1956 establishments in Austria
Political parties established in 1956
German nationalism in Austria
Parties represented in the European Parliament
Member parties of the Identity and Democracy Party
National liberal parties
Right-wing populist parties
Social conservative parties
National conservative parties
Anti-Islam sentiment in Austria
Conservative parties in Austria
Islamophobia in Europe
Right-wing parties in Europe
Far-right political parties in Austria
Defunct liberal political parties in Austria
German nationalist political parties